Saint Francis High School, founded in 1955 by the Brothers of Holy Cross, is a Catholic, co-educational, college preparatory secondary school located in Mountain View, California, United States. The Brothers of Holy Cross serve both on the faculty and on the Board of Directors. The school is located in the Diocese of San Jose in California.

History
The Brothers of Holy Cross opened Saint Francis High School as an all-boys school in September 1955. The original teaching facility was a small frame building, renovated from a grammar school and named Grant Hall after Harry Grant, the first student to enroll. Other buildings included a former residence, Andre House, and some peripheral structures. The grounds were largely orchards. Four Brothers comprised the first-year faculty. The first principal was Brother Donatus Schmitz. He was soon replaced by Brother Fisher Iwasko, who remained several years and is considered the principal founder.

Soon afterwards, the Brothers of Holy Cross invested $210,000 of their own funds and $225,000 of borrowed funds to build Holy Cross Hall. The building contained eight classrooms, three science laboratories, and administrative offices, and was completed in December 1956.

In 1959, Raskob Memorial Gymnasium was built on land donated by Ira and Elise Higgins. By 1962, the student body had grown to 685. In 1972, Saint Francis merged with Holy Cross High School, necessitating additional facilities.

In 2012 the school made a $15,000 investment into the website Snap Inc.; it had taken money from the endowment fund. This investment grew to $24 million by 2017.

Academics 
As a Catholic college preparatory school, Saint Francis requires coursework in English, mathematics, social studies, science, modern language, fine arts, physical education, and religious studies. Saint Francis also provides honors and Advanced Placement program, offering students over 33 AP courses and honors courses.

Notable alumni
Troy Bienemann, former NFL player
Eric Byrnes, former MLB player
Linda Cardellini, actress
Doug Cosbie, former NFL player
Daniel Descalso, former MLB player
Rhett Ellison, former NFL player
Gryffin, DJ
Bob Hamm, former NFL player
Mike Hibler, former NFL player
Tyler Johnson, NBA player
Chase Lyman, former NFL player
Grant Mattos, former NFL player
K. Megan McArthur, astronaut and oceanographer
Delaney Baie Pridham, soccer player
Tim Rossovich, former NFL player
Will Ta'ufo'ou, former NFL player
Joseph McGee, US Army General

Athletics
Saint Francis is well-known for its strong athletic programs. Most of the student-athletes play in the West Catholic Athletic League part of the CIF Central Coast Section a subset of the California Interscholastic Federation. , the school has accumulated 32 CIF-NorCal championships. Saint Francis was named 2021-22 State School of the Year by Cal-High Sports.  

The following sports are offered at Saint Francis:
Baseball
Basketball
Cross country
Field hockey
Football
Golf
Gymnastics
Lacrosse
Soccer
Softball
Swimming & diving
Tennis
Track and field
Volleyball
Water polo
Wrestling

References

External links
 

Holy Cross secondary schools
Catholic secondary schools in California
Roman Catholic Diocese of San Jose in California
Buildings and structures in Mountain View, California
Educational institutions established in 1955
High schools in Santa Clara County, California
1955 establishments in California